Claudiu Vasile Bumba (born 5 January 1994) is a Romanian professional footballer who plays as a winger or an attacking midfielder for Nemzeti Bajnokság I club Fehérvár.

He started out at as a senior at Baia Mare teams FC and FCMU, before moving to FCM Târgu Mureș at age 17 to record his Liga I debut. After a loan spell at Roma Primavera between 2012 and 2013, Bumba returned to the then-renamed ASA Târgu Mureș for two additional years. Since leaving the latter, he went on to appear for sides in Israel, Turkey and Hungary, apart from stints in his native country.

A former Romania youth international at several levels, Bumba earned his first and only cap for the full side in 2012, in a 4–0 friendly victory over Turkmenistan.

Club career

Early career
Bumba made his debut for FC Baia Mare on 10 October 2009, aged 15, in a 1–1 Liga II draw with Gaz Metan CFR Craiova. After the dissolution of the club, he chose to stay in the city with the newly-founded FC Maramureș Universitar Baia Mare, which he aided in achieving promotion to the second division.

Târgu Mureș
Bumba moved to FCM Târgu Mureș of the Liga I in June 2011. On 22 July that year, he registered his debut in the competition in a 0–1 loss at Dinamo București, and on 15 October scored his first league goal to earn his side a 1–1 away draw at Sportul Studențesc.

In February 2012, former Târgu Mureș manager Maurizio Trombetta confirmed that Italian team Udinese was monitoring Bumba. On 25 March, he netted in a 2–0 win over Astra Ploiești. In May, he was included by website and TV channel Sport.ro in a top ten list of Romanian youths to watch. Bumba finished his breakthrough season in Târgu Mureș with three goals from 29 appearances, but his performances could not help his team avoid relegation to the Liga II.

In the summer of 2012, Roma paid €600,000 to loan Bumba for one season. On 6 September, after recovering from an injury, he scored for the under-19 team in a 2–1 defeat of Inter Milan in the Supercoppa Primavera. Bumba returned to Târgu Mureș in July 2013, after the club changed its name from "FCM" to "ASA 2013".

On 11 January 2015, Bumba penned down a three-and-a-half-year deal with fellow Liga I club Astra Giurgiu, but after less than a month returned to ASA Târgu Mureș due to a breach of contract. He amassed 31 appearances and eight goals during the 2014–15 season, as his team finished second in the league championship with only three points behind FC Steaua București.

Hapoel Tel Aviv
On 19 June 2015, Bumba transferred to Israeli Premier League team Hapoel Tel Aviv in a move worth €650,000. He signed a four-year contract and was assigned the number 7 shirt. His debut was recorded on 1 August, starting in a 1–3 derby loss to Maccabi Tel Aviv in the Toto Cup.

Bumba featured in 31 games and scored two goals in all competitions during his first campaign in Israel, as Hapoel finished ninth overall in the national league. In the winter of 2017, he chose to leave the club because of unpaid wages.

Dinamo București / Concordia Chiajna
In February 2017, after a move to CFR Cluj fell through, Bumba returned to Romania by signing a two-and-a-half-year contract with Dinamo București as a free agent. He scored his first goal for "the Red Dogs" on 10 April, in a 2–1 league win against Astra Giurgiu.

Bumba won his first major trophy on 20 May 2017, following Dinamo's 2–0 defeat of ACS Poli Timișoara in the Cupa Ligii final, despite not making any appearances in the competition throughout the season. On 24 August, the club announced the termination of Bumba's contract on a mutual agreement, and one month later he moved to Concordia Chiajna.

On 27 September 2017, less than a week after joining Chiajna, he made his debut and netted in a 3–2 Liga I win over his previous club Dinamo București.

Adanaspor
Bumba changed countries again on 20 July 2018, after agreeing to a two-year deal with Turkish team Adanaspor. He contributed with three goals from 27 appearances during his first and only campaign in the TFF First League.

Kisvárda / Fehérvár
On 19 July 2019, Bumba signed for Hungarian club Kisvárda on a two-year contract with an option for another year. He made his debut on 31 August, entering as a 64th-minute substitute in a 0–3 Nemzeti Bajnokság I loss to Fehérvár.

On 24 June 2022, Bumba was formally unveiled as a Fehérvár player after agreeing to a two-year deal with the team.

International career
Bumba made his debut for the Romania national under-17 team on 21 September 2010, scoring the only goal in a victory over Kazakhstan. He represented the side at the 2011 UEFA European Football Championship, where Romania finished last in its group. On 6 October 2011, Bumba made his debut for the under-19 team by coming on in the 44th minute of a match against Sweden.

Bumba played one game for the Romania senior team on 27 January 2012, when manager Victor Pițurcă brought him on in the 79th minute for Cristian Tănase in a 4–0 friendly victory over Turkmenistan. He impressed with his physical fitness, having an excellent muscular mass and stamina for his age.

Personal life
Bumba has partial Hungarian heritage through one of his great-grandmothers, as he revealed in August 2021. In the same interview, he also stated that he considers taking up Hungarian citizenship after not being called up to the Romania national team in several years.

Career statistics

Club

International

Honours
FCMU Baia Mare
Liga III: 2010–11

Dinamo București
Cupa Ligii: 2016–17

References

External links

Claudiu Bumba at the Turkish Football Federation

1994 births
Living people
Romanian people of Hungarian descent
Sportspeople from Baia Mare
Romanian sportspeople of Hungarian descent
Romanian footballers
Association football midfielders
Association football wingers
Liga I players
Liga II players
Liga III players
CS Minaur Baia Mare (football) players  
ASA 2013 Târgu Mureș players
Israeli Premier League players
Hapoel Tel Aviv F.C. players
FC Dinamo București players
CS Concordia Chiajna players
TFF First League players
Adanaspor footballers
Nemzeti Bajnokság I players
Kisvárda FC players
Fehérvár FC players
Romania youth international footballers
Romania under-21 international footballers
Romania international footballers
Romanian expatriate footballers
Romanian expatriate sportspeople in Italy
Expatriate footballers in Italy
Romanian expatriate sportspeople in Israel
Expatriate footballers in Israel
Romanian expatriate sportspeople in Turkey
Expatriate footballers in Turkey
Romanian expatriate sportspeople in Hungary
Expatriate footballers in Hungary